Sir Herbert Cecil Sloley, KCMG (4 February 1855 – 22 September 1937) was a British colonial policeman and administrator. He was Resident Commissioner for Basutoland from circa 1900 to 1916.

References 

 https://www.ukwhoswho.com/view/10.1093/ww/9780199540891.001.0001/ww-9780199540884-e-217180

1855 births
1937 deaths
Knights Commander of the Order of St Michael and St George
Basutoland people
British colonial police officers
People from Kolkata
Cape Colony people
Resident Commissioners in Basutoland